April March (born Elinor Blake; April 20, 1965) is an American singer-songwriter who sings in English and French. She is known for the song "Chick Habit", which was featured in the films But I'm a Cheerleader and Death Proof. She is also a cartoon animator, including a stint as a principal animator for the Ren and Stimpy show. She went to Parsons The New School for Design and California Institute of the Arts for Character Animation.

Early life and education
In junior high, Blake participated in an exchange program in France. She graduated from Phillips Academy in Andover, Massachusetts in 1983.

Career
Blake returned to New York City and worked as an animator for Archie Comics and Pee Wee's Playhouse. In 1986 she worked on the Madonna feature Who's That Girl, animating the star in the title sequence and the contemporaneous music video.

March's first band, The Pussywillows, was formed in 1987. She took a break from music for one year to attend the Disney-founded Character Animation program at the California Institute of the Arts. In 1991 the Pussywillows broke up and March formed The Shitbirds, which lasted until 1995. Since then, March has recorded as a solo artist and has appeared on motion picture soundtracks, as well as performing the theme song for the Cartoon Network series I Am Weasel. Her albums contain songs sung in both English and French, and her style is heavily influenced by French 1960s pop music.

March traveled to France to record the album Chrominance Decoder with Bertrand Burgalat's label Tricatel. Tricatel released the album in France and Japan in 1996, along with two singles, "Mignonette" and "Garçon Glaçon", and a promotional video created by Bergalat.  Ideal Records released it in the United States, with the addition of some remixes contributed by The Dust Brothers, and Tricatel released a Vinyl edition in 2011.

March developed and performed an English translation of the Serge Gainsbourg song, "Laisse tomber les filles", renamed as "Chick Habit." The song has been featured in the 1999 teen comedy But I'm a Cheerleader and in Quentin Tarantino's 2007 film Death Proof; it was also used as the backing music to television advertisements for the Renault Twingo in the UK and in France in 2008. It is part of the soundtrack of the immersive theatre production by Punchdrunk The Drowned Man in London, which played until March 2014. The song was used as background music for a non-official trailer for The Trilogy (2007) by Dan and Dave.

Her song Garçon Glaçon is featured in the American show The O.C.

March has collaborated with many artists, including Brian Wilson, Yo La Tengo, Ronnie Spector, Andy Paley, LL Cool J, Jonathan Richman, and the Dust Brothers in the U.S. and in France with Bertrand Burgalat. She has performed with the garage rock band Bassholes. Her collaboration album with Steve Hanft, titled Magic Monsters., was released online in 2008 and later in vinyl format on the label Martyrs of Pop.

Discography

Albums
 Gainsbourgsion ! (1995) – France only
 Paris in April (1996) – International expanded version of Gainsbourgsion!
 Superbanyair (1997) – Japan only 
 April March Sings Along with The Makers (1997) – Collaboration with The Makers
 Lessons of April March (1998) – Compilation
 April March and Los Cincos (1998)
 Chrominance Decoder (1999) – International version of Superbanyair.
 Triggers (2002)
 Magic Monsters (2008) – Collaboration with Steve Hanft
 April March and Aquaserge (2012)
 In Cinerama (2021) – Originally a "Record Store Day"-only release

EPs
 Voodoo Doll (1993)
 Chick Habit (1995)
 April March and Los Cincos Featuring The Choir (1997) – Japan only limited edition. Features Petra Haden and Bennett.
 Dans les yeux d'April March (1999) – France only. Limited edition Tricatel Club Release. Pressed on 10" translucent white vinyl.

Singles
 "Mignonette" (1996)
 "Sometimes When I Stretch" (2003)
 "Jesus And I Love You" (1998) – Orgazmo Soundtrack

References

External links

 Discogs

http://www.aprilmarch.com

1965 births
Living people
American animators
American women singers
Sympathy for the Record Industry artists
American indie pop musicians
American women animators
Phillips Academy alumni
California Institute of the Arts alumni
French-language singers of the United States
21st-century American women